Giorgio A. Tsoukalos  (born 14 March 1978) is a Swiss-born writer, and television presenter and producer. He is a ufologist and a promoter of the ancient astronauts hypothesis. He is best known for his appearances on Ancient Aliens, a History channel series of which he is also producer.

Career 
Tsoukalos is of Greek-Austrian heritage. He is a 1998 graduate of Ithaca College in Ithaca, New York, with a bachelor's degree in Communications. For several years he worked as a bodybuilding promoter and a volunteer in IFBB sanctioned bodybuilding contests, including Mr. Olympia. He produced and directed the annual IFBB San Francisco Pro Grand Prix from 2001 to 2005.

Since 2002, Tsoukalos has appeared in programs broadcast by Travel Channel, History, Syfy, and National Geographic. He was the editor of Legendary Times magazine from 1999 to 2008. He is a co-executive producer of Ancient Aliens, and he has appeared in more than 200 episodes since 2009. He presented and co-produced the 2014 H2 series In Search of Aliens.

Ancient Aliens meme 
Tsoukalos's appearances in Ancient Aliens inspired a meme highlighting his unusual hairstyle overlaid with the caption: "I'm not saying it was aliens … but …" Variations of the meme were uploaded by users as early as November 2010. According to Dictionary.com, the meme mimicked "the tone of conviction used by Tsoukalos to present unfounded far-fetched pseudo-logic as fact."

In a 2015 Reddit AMA, Tsoukalos said he loved the meme, adding "it's a great honor to have been embraced" by Internet users. During a 2016 appearance on CNN Philippines, Tsoukalos's meme-ification was discussed at length. A partial transcript of the interview was later published online as "Meet the Hair Guy from Ancient Aliens."

In 2021, Tsoukalos made a cameo appearance in the Resident Alien episode "Welcome Aliens". He was described by the lead character as "that high-haired gentleman".  The episode included several references to Ancient Aliens meme. Tsoukalos reprised his cameo in the 2022 episode "Best of Enemies".

Filmography

References

External links

 
 
 

1978 births
Ancient astronauts proponents
Internet memes
Ithaca College alumni
Living people
Mythographers
People from Lucerne
Swiss editors
Swiss conspiracy theorists
Swiss emigrants to the United States
Swiss people of Greek descent
Swiss people of Austrian descent
Ufologists
Pseudohistorians